Citadel is an upcoming American science fiction drama television series created by Josh Appelbaum and Bryan Oh for Amazon Prime Video. It stars Richard Madden and Priyanka Chopra as Citadel agents Mason Kane and Nadia Sinh. The series includes spinoffs in different countries and languages. As per Amazon, "All of the local series are meant to enhance the entire entertainment experience and will be available for the viewer to deep dive into an imagined layered world."

The Indian adaptation of the series, starring Varun Dhawan and Samantha Ruth Prabhu will be directed by Raj Nidimoru and Krishna DK and produced by Amazon Studios. According to reports, the Indian version of Citadel will begin filming in January 2023. Varun Dhawan has been confirmed as the series main lead actor by filmmaker. They shared a poster featuring Varun Dhawan on social media. According to media reports, Samantha Ruth Prabhu will share screen time with Varun Dhawan in Citadel-Hindi. It will be their first time they are working together. However, no official announcement has yet been made.

The Italian series will be co-produced by Amazon Studios and Cattleya, part of ITV Studios.

In March 2023, the series was renewed for a second season. The six-episode first season is scheduled to premiere on April 28, 2023, with its first two episodes.

Premise 
The show is described as an "action-packed spy series with a compelling emotional center" and "an expansive and groundbreaking global event comprising a mothership series and several local language satellite series". It includes spinoffs set in the Italian Alps, India, Spain and Mexico.

Cast
 Richard Madden as Mason Kane
 Priyanka Chopra as Nadia Sinh
 Stanley Tucci as Bernard Orlick  
 Lesley Manville as Dahlia Archer 
 Osy Ikhile as Carter Spence 
 Ashleigh Cummings as Abby Conroy 
 Roland Møller as Anders Silje and Davik Silje 
 Caoilinn Springall as Hendrix Conroy

Episodes

Production

Development
Richard Madden said of the plot and his character: "There are multiple characters and multiple storylines that all intertwine, and I personally play a character who is an amnesiac—eight years of his life, he’s basically become a new person. There's a journey of discovering who he was before the accident happened, and he no longer remembers anything. It's a clash between the life that he's been living for eight years, and the life that he used to live. You get to delve into exploring the psyche of dealing with the consequences of things that you're not aware that you've done." Priyanka Chopra speaking to WWD talked about Citadel and what we can expect from the show  “Then I have the exact opposite of that — a spy show with the Russo brothers for Amazon Prime with Richard Madden and Stanley Tucci. It’s called Citadel and it’s really going to be amazing. It was a lot of work. I have a lot of scars to prove it.”

Citadel is the second most expensive series of all time with a budget of US$250 million.

Casting 
Starring alongside Madden and Chopra, Roland Møller will play Laszlo Milla, a lead operative of Citadel's rival intelligence agency, Manticore.

Filming 
Filming on the main series wrapped in June 2022 and is currently in post-production.

Release 
The six-episode series is scheduled to premiere on April 28, 2023 on Amazon Prime Video, with its first two episodes being available for viewing immediately.

References

External links 
 
 

2020s American drama television series
2020s American science fiction television series
American action television series
American spy drama television series
English-language television shows
Upcoming drama television series
Science fiction adventure television series
Amazon Prime Video original programming
Television shows filmed in the United Kingdom
Television series by Amazon Studios